Instinct is the second studio album by American deathcore band As Blood Runs Black. It is the band's first album to feature guitarists Dan Sugarman and Greg Kirkpatrick, and the only album to feature vocalist Sonik Garcia.

Track listing

Credits
As Blood Runs Black
Sonik Garcia – vocals
Greg Kirkpatrick – rhythm guitar
Dan Sugarman – lead guitar
Nick Stewart – bass
Hector "Leche" De Santiago – drums
Production
Produced by As Blood Runs Black
Engineered, Mixed, Mastered & drum engineering by Zack Ohren @ Undercity Recordings, North Hollywood, CA
Vocal engineering by Taylor Voeltz
Additional composer: Ernie Flores
Executive Producer & A&R – Baron Bodnar
Artwork
Artwork by Gary Tonge
Layout by Daniel McBride
Photo by Luis Lopez Descartes

Chart performance

References

2011 albums
As Blood Runs Black albums
Mediaskare Records albums